Xenogryllus is a genus of crickets (Orthoptera: Ensifera) in the family Gryllidae, subfamily Eneopterinae and tribe Xenogryllini.  Species have been found in (mostly tropical) Africa and Asia (including India, Indo-China, China, Korea and Japan).

Species
There are currently 8 described species in Xenogryllus:
 Xenogryllus eneopteroides Bolívar, 1890 – type species (locality: Duque de Bragança (Calandula), Angola)
 Xenogryllus lamottei Robillard, 2019
 Xenogryllus maichauensis Gorochov, 1992
 Xenogryllus maniema Robillard & Jaiswara, 2019
 Xenogryllus marmoratus (Haan, 1844)
 Xenogryllus mozambicus Robillard, 2019
 Xenogryllus transversus (Walker, 1869)
 Xenogryllus ululiu Gorochov, 1990

References

External links
 
 

Ensifera genera
crickets
Orthoptera of Asia
Orthoptera of Africa